Oliver Zono (born ) is a South African rugby union player for the  in the Currie Cup and in the Rugby Challenge. His regular position is fly-half. As of 2020 he plays for Krasny Yar Krasnoyarsk in Russia.

Rugby career

Border Bulldogs

Zono was born and grew up in Fort Beaufort. He played youth rugby for the  team in the 2009 and 2010 Under-19 Provincial Championships, before representing the University of Fort Hare in the Varsity Shield competition in 2013 and 2014.

He established himself as a regular in the Border team, finishing the 2014 Currie Cup First Division competition as his team's top scorer, despite making just two appearances. He remained with the East London-based team until 2017, making a total of 44 appearances in four seasons.

Southern Kings

In August 2017, the Port Elizabeth-based  franchise announced that they signed Zono for the 2017–18 Pro14 season, their first campaign in the competition after losing their Super Rugby membership. He made a total of nine appearances in his debut season, kicking seven conversions and three penalties for a personal points haul of 23 points.

References

South African rugby union players
Living people
1991 births
People from Raymond Mhlaba Local Municipality
Rugby union fly-halves
Border Bulldogs players
Southern Kings players
Eastern Province Elephants players
Rugby union players from the Eastern Cape